The 1824 Connecticut gubernatorial election was held on April 8, 1824. Incumbent governor and Toleration Party candidate Oliver Wolcott Jr. defeated former congressman and Federalist Party candidate Timothy Pitkin, winning with 88.81% of the vote.

General election

Candidates
Major candidates

Oliver Wolcott Jr., Toleration
Timothy Pitkin, Federalist

Minor candidates

David Plant, Jacksonian

Results

References

1824
Connecticut
Gubernatorial